Podgórzyce may refer to the following places:
Podgórzyce, Łódź Voivodeship (central Poland)
Podgórzyce, Lubusz Voivodeship (west Poland)
Podgórzyce, Masovian Voivodeship (east-central Poland)